Edward Fenwick Tattnall (June 3, 1788 – November 21, 1832) was an American politician, soldier and lawyer.

Biography
Born in Savannah, Georgia in 1788, Tattnall was educated in England. He was solicitor general from November 1816 until September 1817. He served in the Georgia House of Representatives in 1818 and 1819. Tattnall was elected as a Democratic-Republican Representative from Georgia to the 17th United States Congress. He was reelected to the 18th, 19th and 20th United States Congresses and served from March 4, 1821, until his resignation in 1827 before the start of the 20th Congress.

Tattnall served as first captain of the Savannah Volunteer Guards. He died in Savannah on November 21, 1832, and was buried in that city's Bonaventure Cemetery.

External links

 
 

1788 births
1832 deaths
Members of the Georgia House of Representatives
Georgia (U.S. state) lawyers
Politicians from Savannah, Georgia
Democratic-Republican Party members of the United States House of Representatives from Georgia (U.S. state)
Jacksonian members of the United States House of Representatives from Georgia (U.S. state)
19th-century American politicians